Potassium voltage-gated channel subfamily E member 4, originally named MinK-related peptide 3 or MiRP3 when it was discovered, is a protein that in humans is encoded by the KCNE4 gene.

Function 

Voltage-gated potassium channels (Kv) represent the most complex class of voltage-gated ion channels from both functional and structural standpoints.  Their diverse functions include regulating neurotransmitter release, heart rate, insulin secretion, neuronal excitability, epithelial electrolyte transport, smooth muscle contraction, and cell volume.  The KCNE4 gene encodes KCNE4 (originally named MinK-related peptide 3 or MiRP3), a member of the KCNE family of voltage-gated potassium (Kv) channel ancillary or β subunits.

KCNE4 is best known for modulating the KCNQ1 Kv α subunit, but it also regulates KCNQ4, Kv1.x, Kv2.1, Kv4.x and BK α subunits in heterologous co-expression experiments and/or in vivo. KCNE4 often, but not always, acts as an inhibitory subunit to suppress potassium channel function, but this varies depending on the channel subtype.

KCNE4 strongly inhibits the KCNQ1 potassium channel, which is known to play important roles in human cardiac myocyte repolarization, and in multiple epithelial cell types. KCNE4 inhibition of KCNQ1 requires calmodulin, which binds to both KCNQ1 and KCNE4. KCNE4 can also inhibit complexes formed by KCNQ1 and KCNE1.  KCNE4 has no known effect on KCNQ2, KCNQ3 or KCNQ5 channels, but augments activity of KCNQ4 in HEK cells, mesenteric artery and Xenopus laevis oocytes.

KCNE4 strongly inhibits Kv1.1 and Kv1.3 channels when co-expressed in HEK cells and in Xenopus laevis oocytes, while leaving Kv1.2 and Kv1.4 currents unaffected. KCNE4 augments Kv1.5 current and surface expression twofold in CHO cells (but had no effect in Xenopus oocytes). Kcne4 deletion from mice impaired currents attributable to Kv1.5, in ventricular myocytes.

KCNE4 inhibited Kv2.1 currents by 90% but had little to no effect on currents generated by heteromers of Kv2.1 with the regulatory α subunit Kv6.4.

KCNE4 slows activation and inactivation of Kv4.2 channels, and induces overshoot upon recovery from inactivation. Co-expression with KChIP2 produces intermediate gating kinetics in complexes with Kv4.2 and KCNE4. Deletion of Kcne4 in mice impaired ventricular myocyte Ito, a current generated at least in part by Kv4.2.

Although mouse KCNE4 reportedly had no effect on Kv4.3 when coexpressed in oocytes, human KCNE4 was found to accelerate inactivation and recovery from inactivation of Kv4.3-KChIP2 complexes.

KCNE4 has also been found to regulate the large-conductance Ca2+-activated potassium channel, BK. KCNE4 inhibits BK activity by positive-shifting the voltage dependence of BK activation and accelerating BK protein degradation.

Structure 
KCNE4 is a type 1 membrane protein, with the transmembrane segment predicted to be alpha-helical. No studies have as yet reported the number of KCNE4 subunits within a functional channel complex; it is likely to be either 2 or 4.  The majority of studies of KCNE4 function, structure-function relationships and effects of pathological gene sequence variants within KCNE4 have utilized the widely reported 170 residue version of the protein encoded by exon 2 of the human KCNE4 gene.  However, in 2016 a longer form of the KCNE4 protein, termed KCNE4L, was discovered. An additional N-terminal portion of 51 residues, encoded by exon 1 of the human KCNE4 gene, were found to also be expressed in multiple human tissues, extending the human protein to 221 residues, by far the longest of the KCNE subunits. Human KCNE4L exhibits some functional differences to the shorter 170 residue form now also termed KCNE4S.  KCNE4L is predicted to also be expressed in other mammals, reptiles, amphibians and fish, although the house mouse (Mus musculus) appears to only express KCNE4S because the KCNE4L start site is lacking in the house mouse genome.

Tissue distribution 
Human KCNE4L transcripts are most highly expressed in uterus, and next most highly expressed in atria, adrenal gland, lymph nodes, pituitary gland, spleen and ureter. KCNE4L transcript is also detectable in cervix, colon, optic nerve, ovary, oviduct, pancreas, skin, retina, spinal cord, stomach, thymus, and vagina.

In the rat heart, KCNE4 protein co-localizes with Kv4.2, a channel that KCNE4 also functionally regulates. In mouse heart, KCNE4 is preferentially expressed in ventricles versus atria, and in young adult males much more than young adult females. This is because cardiac KCNE4 expression is positively regulated by dihydrotestosterone. In rat mesenteric artery, KCNE4 augments KCNQ4 channel activity to regulate arterial tone.

Clinical significance 
A single polymorphism in the KCNE4 intracellular N-terminal domain, E145D, has been reported to affect predisposition to the relatively common chronic cardiac arrhythmia, atrial fibrillation, in Chinese populations, and to impair the ability of KCNE4 to inhibit KCNQ1. If KCNE4 inhibits KCNQ1 in the atrium, it is conceivable that removing this inhibition could shorten the atrial effective refractory period, which could predispose to atrial fibrillation, but this mechanism has not yet been substantiated with in vivo data.

See also 
 Voltage-gated potassium channel

Notes

References

Further reading

External links 
 

Ion channels